Baptini is a tribe of geometer moths in the subfamily Ennominae.

Genera
Borbacha Moore, [1887]
Bulonga Walker, 1859
Crypsicometa Warren, 1894
Curbia Warren, 1894
Eurychoria Prout, 1916
Eurytaphria Warren, 1893
Hypoplectis Hübner, 1823
Hypulia Swinhoe, 1894
Lomographa Hübner, [1825]
Nothomiza Warren, 1894
Palyas Guenée in Boisduval & Guenée, 1857
Parasynegia Warren, 1893
Phrygionis Hübner, [1825]
Platycerota Hampson, 1893
Plesiomorpha Warren, 1898
Rhynchobapta Hampson, 1895
Synegia Guenée in Boisduval & Guenée, 1857
Tasta Walker, [1863]
Yashmakia Warren, 1901

References

 
Moth tribes